The year 1786 in science and technology involved some significant events.

Astronomy
 January 17 – Pierre Méchain first observes Comet Encke, from Paris.
 August 1 – Caroline Herschel becomes the first woman to discover a comet.

Biology
 Subfossil bones of the Rodrigues solitaire are discovered.

Linguistics
 February 2 – In a speech before The Asiatic Society in Calcutta, Sir William Jones notes the formal resemblances between Latin, Greek, and Sanskrit, laying the foundation for comparative linguistics and Indo-European studies.

Mathematics
 Erland Samuel Bring publishes , proposing algebraic solutions to quintic functions.
 Lagrange moves from Prussia to Paris under the patronage of Louis XVI of France.
 William Playfair produces the first line and bar charts.

Technology
 August – James Rumsey tests his first steamboat in the Potomac river at Shepherdstown, Virginia.
 Ignaz von Born introduces a method of extracting metals using the patio process in his Ueber des Anquicken der gold- und silberhältigen Erze, published in Vienna.
 Scottish millwright Andrew Meikle invents a practical threshing machine.

Awards
 Copley Medal: Not awarded

Births
 January 5 – Thomas Nuttall, English naturalist (died 1859)
 February 26 – François Arago, French mathematician, physicist and astronomer (died 1853)
 February 28 – Christian Ramsay, Scottish botanist (died 1839)
 April 16 – Thomas Sewall, American anatomist (died 1845)
 April 28 – Elizabeth Andrew Warren, Cornish botanist and marine algolologist   (died 1864)
 July 24 – Joseph Nicollet, French geographer, explorer, mathematician and astronomer (died 1843)
 November 3 – Ernst Friedrich Germar, German entomologist (died 1853)
 December 6 – Johann Georg Bodmer, Swiss mechanical engineer and inventor (died 1864)

Deaths
 February 25 – Thomas Wright, English astronomer, mathematician, instrument maker, architect, garden designer, antiquary and genealogist (born 1711)
 May 2 – Petronella Johanna de Timmerman, Dutch scientist (born 1723)
 May 4 – Leonardo Ximenes, Tuscan polymath (born 1716)
 May 15 – Eva Ekeblad, agronomist, first woman in the Swedish Royal Academy of Science (born 1724)
 May 21 – Carl Wilhelm Scheele, Swedish chemist (born 1742)
 October 16 – Alexander Wilson, Scottish polymath (born 1714)
 November 10 – John Hope, Scottish physician and botanist (born 1725)

References

 
18th century in science
1780s in science